Engyon (in some Byzantine texts of Ptolemy and Plutarch)  is an ancient town of the interior of Sicily, a Cretan colony, according to Diodorus Siculus and famous for an ancient temple of the Magna Mater (Mother Rhea) imported from Crete, which aroused the greed of Verres. It took its name from a spring that arose in the land chosen by the colonists, as explained in the following excerpt from Diodorus:

Timoleon attacked the city, while the tyrant Leptines was the ruler. After he defeated the Leptines, he restored its autonomy.

Its site is uncertain; some topographers have identified it with Gangi, a town 30 km SSE of Cefalù, but only on the ground of the similarity of the two names. Others identify it with Troina.

References

 

Ancient Sicily
Greek city-states
Colonies in antiquity